Allestree is a suburb and ward of the city of Derby, a unitary authority area, in Derbyshire, England. Of the 16 listed buildings in the ward, two are classified by English Heritage as Grade II*, the rest as Grade II; Allestree has no Grade I Listed buildings.

Allestree village is a conservation area, designated under section 69 of the Planning (Listed Buildings and Conservation Areas) Act 1990. Allestree's buildings are varied, reflecting its rural and historic nature, and include the old manor hall and associated ice house, the church, and local houses. Locally sourced stone for walls and slate for roofs are the predominant building materials, used for places of worship, the school, houses (including many not listed), and boundary dry stone walls.

Allestree Hall, a former manor house made of Derwent millstone grit, is located in Allestree Park a short distance from the village centre.

The term "listed building", in the United Kingdom, refers to a building or structure designated as being of special architectural, historical, or cultural significance. They are categorised in three grades: Grade I consists of buildings of outstanding architectural or historical interest, Grade II* includes significant buildings of more than local interest and Grade II consists of buildings of special architectural or historical interest. Buildings in England are listed by the Secretary of State for Culture, Media and Sport on recommendations provided by English Heritage, which also determines the grading.

Key

Listed buildings and structures

References 

Lists of listed buildings in Derbyshire
Listed buildings in Derby